Amanda Jo Adkins (born December 5, 1976), later known by her married name Amanda Schneider, is an American former competition swimmer.  Adkins represented the United States at the 2000 Summer Olympics in Sydney, Australia.  She competed in the women's 200-meter backstroke, advanced to the event final, and finished fifth overall with a time of 2:12.35.

See also
 List of University of Georgia people

References

1976 births
Living people
American female backstroke swimmers
Georgia Bulldogs women's swimmers
Olympic swimmers of the United States
Sportspeople from Peoria, Illinois
Swimmers at the 2000 Summer Olympics